William Bryant (22 December 1940 – 9 June 2019), known as "Big Bill", was an English professional rugby league footballer who played in the 1950s, 1960s and 1970s.

Background
Bill Bryant's birth was registered in Lower Agbrigg district, Wakefield, West Riding of Yorkshire, he was the landlord of The Castlefields (The Honky Tonk) public house, Vickers Street, Castleford, he also owned a bar in Tenerife.

Playing career

International honours
Bill Bryant won caps for Great Britain while at Castleford in 1964 against France (2 matches), in 1966 against Australia (2 matches), and in 1967 against France.

County honours
Bill Bryant won caps playing left-, i.e. number 11, for Yorkshire while at Castleford in the 14–6 victory over Cumberland at Whitehaven's stadium on 9 September 1964, the 3–19 defeat by Cumberland at Hull Kingston Rovers' stadium on 8 September 1965, the 15–9 victory over New Zealand at Castleford's stadium on 20 September 1965, the 16–13 victory over Lancashire at Swinton's stadium on 10 November 65, the 17–22 defeat by Lancashire at Leeds' stadium on 21 September 1966, and the 34–23 victory over Cumberland at Castleford's stadium on 25 October 1967.

County League appearances
Bill Bryant played in Castleford's victory in the Yorkshire County League during the 1964–65 season.

BBC2 Floodlit Trophy Final appearances
Bill Bryant played left-, i.e. number 11, in Castleford's 4–0 victory over St. Helens in the 1965 BBC2 Floodlit Trophy Final during the 1965–66 season at Knowsley Road, St. Helens on Tuesday 14 December 1965, played left- in the 7–2 victory over Swinton in the 1966 BBC2 Floodlit Trophy Final during the 1966–67 season at Wheldon Road, Castleford on Tuesday 20 December 1966, and played left- in the 8–5 victory over Leigh in the 1967 BBC2 Floodlit Trophy Final during the 1967–68 season at Headingley Rugby Stadium, Leeds on Saturday 16 January 1968.

Club career
Bill Bryant sustained a broken-leg prior to the 1968–69 Challenge Cup Final, and consequently he did not play in the final, he never fully recovered from this injury, and he retired from playing rugby league in 1970.

Death
Bryant died on 9 June 2019, at the age of 78.

Honoured at Castleford Tigers
Bill Bryant is a Tigers Hall of Fame Inductee.

Genealogical information
Bill Bryant's marriage to May (née Rollinson) was registered during first ¼ 1960 in Pontefract district. They had children; Mark A. Bryant (registered during second ¼  in Pontefract district). Bill Bryant was the younger brother of the rugby league footballer who played in the 1950s and 1960s for Castleford and Bramley, Edward Bryant/Eddie Bryant (birth registered third ¼ 1938 in Wakefield district).

References

External links
Great Britain Statistics at englandrl.co.uk (statistics currently missing due to not having appeared for both Great Britain, and England)
Bill Bryant Memory Box Search at archive.castigersheritage.com
Bill Bryant
Down Memory Lane with Bill Bryant
Hardisty delighted as Tigers turn back the clock

1940 births
2019 deaths
Castleford Tigers players
English rugby league players
Great Britain national rugby league team players
Rugby league players from Wakefield
Rugby league second-rows
Yorkshire rugby league team players